Mid Valley City is a large mixed development in the Lembah Pantai ward in southwestern Kuala Lumpur, Malaysia. The development consists of The Gardens shopping mall, Mid Valley Megamall and three hotels, namely the Cititel Mid Valley, The Boulevard Hotel Kuala Lumpur and the Gardens Hotels and Residences.

Background

When it was planned in the late 1980s, it was initially named Bandar Syed Putra, named after Jalan Syed Putra Federal Route 2 that runs through the southern flank of the development. The site that was selected for the development was formerly occupied by an abattoir.

Accessibility
It is accessible by both road and rail transport.

Public transportation

Railway and metro
The KTM station connects directly with the eastern entrance of Mid Valley Megamall.

Pedestrian access is possible via a walk from the Robinsons store in The Gardens mall, first via a bridge across the Klang River, then through the adjacent KL Eco City development project. A pedestrian bridge from The Gardens mall to Abdullah Hukum station is however being constructed, and is scheduled to open to public around February or March 2019.

Buses
Mid Valley City is a stop for RapidKL buses routes including 822 (to  LRT Bangsar), T788 (to  LRT Universiti) and T817 (to  MRT PB Damansara).

The Gardens mall also provided shuttle bus services to Mont Kiara ( Segambut), but it is restricted to Mont Kiara residents only.

Car
Mid Valley City is located at the northern end of Jalan Klang Lama.

Jalan Syed Putra, part of the Federal Highway Federal Route 2, runs through the eastern and southern boundary of Mid Valley City, with an exit after the Petron gas station.

MSC Status
Mid Valley City has been awarded MSC Malaysia Cyber Center status since 22 September 2008. Offices in the development offer competitive date center rates and high-speed broadband access.

Gallery

References

External links
 The Gardens Website
 Mid Valley City Website
 Cititel Mid Valley Website
 The Boulevard Hotel Kuala Lumpur Website
 Gardens Hotel and Residences Website
 The Gardens Pictures
 Mid Valley Megamall
 Cititel Mid Valley
 Church in Mid Valley City
 Mid Valley City Fans Community

Shopping malls in Kuala Lumpur